Extreme Networks is an American networking company based in San Jose, California. Extreme Networks designs, develops, and manufactures wired and wireless network infrastructure equipment and develops the software for network management, policy, analytics, security and access controls.

History
Extreme Networks was established by co-founders Gordon Stitt, Herb Schneider, and Stephen Haddock in 1996 in California, United States, with its first offices located in Cupertino, which later moved to Santa Clara, and later to San Jose. Early investors included Norwest Venture Partners, AVI Capital Management, Trinity Ventures, and Kleiner Perkins Caufield & Byers. Gordon Stitt was a co-founder and served as chief executive officer until August 2006, when he retired and became chairman of the board of directors.

The initial public offering in April 1999 was listed on the NASDAQ stock exchange as ticker "EXTR."

In April 2013, Charles W. Berger (from ParAccel as it was acquired by Actian) replaced Oscar Rodriguez as CEO.

In November 2014, Extreme Networks was named the first Official Wi-Fi solutions provider of the NFL.

On April 19, 2015, Charles W. Berger resigned as CEO, and was replaced by Board Chairman Ed Meyercord.

In September 2020, analyst firm Omdia named Extreme Networks the fast-growing vendor in cloud-managed networking.

In November 2021, Extreme Networks was named a Leader in the 2021 Gartner Magic Quadrant for Wired and Wireless LAN Access Infrastructure for the fourth consecutive year by Gartner analysts.

Acquisitions

In October 1996, Extreme Networks acquired Mammoth Technology.

Extreme Networks acquired Optranet in February 2001 and Webstacks in March 2001. Extreme had invested in both companies, which were purchased for about $73 million and $74 million respectively.

On September 12, 2013, Extreme Networks announced it would acquire Enterasys Networks for about $180 million.

On October 31, 2016, Extreme Networks announced that it completed the acquisition of Zebra Technologies' wireless LAN business for about $55 million.

On March 7, 2017, Extreme Networks announced its intention to acquire Avaya's networking business in a transaction valued at $100 million. The acquisition officially closed on July 17, 2017. As part of this transaction, Extreme acquired customers, personnel, and technology assets from Avaya. The acquisition strengthens Extreme's position in the education, healthcare, and government markets with the addition of Avaya's award-winning Fabric technology for highly secure, simplified access, management, and control. The acquisition also strengthens Extreme's switching portfolio, including a new family of high-performance modular switches, software tools, and IoT technology. Extreme has publicly stated that it expects to "generate over $200 million in additional annualized revenue" from the acquired networking assets from Avaya.

On March 29, 2017, Extreme Networks announced its intention to acquire Brocade's SRA (Switching, Routing, and Analytics) business from Broadcom for an undisclosed sum. The acquisition officially closed on October 30, 2017, and with it, Extreme acquires customer relationships, personnel, and technology assets from Brocade including the SLX, VDX, MLX, CES, CER, Workflow Composer, Automation Suites, and certain other Data Center related products. Extreme has publicly stated that it anticipates "the transaction will generate over $230 million in additional annualized revenue from the acquired assets".

On June 26, 2019, Extreme Networks announced its intention to acquire Aerohive Networks for $272 million. Aerohive's cloud-managed portfolio of wireless, LAN, and SD-WAN products is well-regarded in the industry. The acquisition was completed on August 9, 2019 at an aggregate purchase price of approximately $272 million.

On September 15, 2021, Extreme Networks acquired Infovista's Ipanema SD-WAN business.

Therefore, through a series of historical and contemporary merger and acquisition activity, Extreme Networks claims an industry lineage that includes, at a minimum, the networking-focused elements of the following companies: Digital, Chantry, Siemens, Cabletron, Enterasys, AirDefense, Symbol, Motorola, Zebra, Wellfleet, SynOptics, Bay Networks, Nortel Networks, Avaya, Vistapointe, StackStorm, Foundry Networks, Brocade, and Aerohive Networks. Extreme Networks itself claims that the combined entity should now be able to generate annual revenues in the region of US $1 billion and to now rank in the top three enterprise networking companies (measured by revenue), and Zeus Kerravala, an industry pundit, has observed that "a bigger, more profitable Extreme will have more money to invest in R&D, fueling further innovation."

Products
The Extreme Networks product lines, ExtremeApplications, ExtremeWireless, ExtremeSwitching, and ExtremeRouting, are available across the data center, campus, and edge. Extreme’s services offerings include professional, premier, maintenance, and managed services, in addition to 100% in-sourced support services.

Extreme Networks announced its first 10 Gigabit Ethernet product in 2002, available with its modular BlackDiamond 6800 Ethernet Switch.

In 2014, Extreme Networks introduced network-powered application analytics, ExtremeAnalytics, enabling greater business performance.

In 2017 and as a result of the Avaya networking business integration, Extreme Networks introduced Extreme Fabric Connect, a standards-based fabric technology based on enhanced IEEE 802.1aq Shortest Path Bridging and IETF 6329, Extreme Fabric Connect combines decades of experience with Ethernet and Intermediate System-to-Intermediate System (IS-IS) to deliver a next-generation technology that combines the best of Ethernet with the best of IP.

In January 2019, Extreme Networks made AI-Infused 802.11ax (Wi-Fi 6) Access Points and Multi-Rate Switches available to enterprises in all industries.

In February 2019, Extreme Networks rolled out Extreme Defender for IoT, a simple security solution to help organizations secure unsecured IoT devices and network endpoints. Defender for IoT can be deployed on any network and staff can use it to isolate and protect both wired and wireless IoT devices from cyberattacks.

In October 2019, Extreme Networks announced  ExtremeCloud IQ, a cloud-based enterprise network management application, to its portfolio as a result of the Aerohive Networks acquisition. In June 2020, ExtremeCloud IQ became the only fourth-generation cloud platform on the market available across all major cloud providers (Amazon Web Services, Google Cloud Platform, Microsoft Azure) with an unlimited data offering. ExtremeCloud IQ was named CRN magazine's networking product of the year award for 2020.

In late October 2019, Extreme Networks selected Broadcom’s networking chipsets and programmable silicon to power all new Extreme hardware products from the edge to the data center. Broadcom's Trident family of switch ICs are embedded in ExtremeSwitching technology, bringing the same telemetry capabilities leveraged by leading hyperscale cloud providers to the enterprise.

In September 2020, Extreme announced universal platforms for enterprise-class switching and wireless infrastructure. End-users of universal platforms can use the same hardware to run multiple Extreme operating systems, providing flexibility and choice while optimizing total cost of ownership.

In October 2020, Extreme Networks became the first networking vendor to offer Bluetooth and BLE intrusion prevention and Wi-Fi security within a single wireless intrusion prevention system – Extreme AirDefense.

In July 2021, Extreme Networks became the first vendor in the industry to ship an enterprise-grade Wi-Fi 6E solution.

See also
 List of networking hardware vendors
 Ethernet Automatic Protection Switching (EAPS)
 ExtremeXOS

References

Networking companies of the United States
Networking hardware companies
Manufacturing companies based in San Jose, California
Technology companies based in the San Francisco Bay Area
Computer companies established in 1996
American companies established in 1996
1996 establishments in California
Companies listed on the Nasdaq
1999 initial public offerings